The 18th Rhythmic Gymnastics European Championships were held in Granada, Spain, from 9 to 10 November 2002.
Medals were contested in two disciplines : team competition and senior individual all-around.

Medal winners

Medal table

References

External links 
European Union of Gymnastics

Rhythmic Gymnastics European Championships
Rhythmic Gymnastics European Championships